Ben Sinclair (born May 16, 1984) is an American actor, writer, director, and producer.

Early life and education 
Sinclair grew up in Scottsdale, Arizona. His mother is a cantor at a Reform synagogue; his father is a public school teacher. Sinclair attended Oberlin College.

Career
Sinclair is the co-creator, writer, and star of High Maintenance, a Vimeo web series and HBO television series set in New York City. The series is partially inspired by experiences from his personal life, and first aired in 2012. His final performance as his High Maintenance character was as a small cameo on HBO's Betty, also filmed in New York City.

He has also directed four episodes of FXX’s Dave.

Personal life
Sinclair married his writing partner and High Maintenance co-creator Katja Blichfeld in 2010, after meeting at a 2009 party in Los Angeles. They came up with the idea for the show while on a bicycle ride across the Williamsburg Bridge, and started the show in 2012. Blichfield and Sinclair divorced amicably in 2016, prior to undertaking season two of High Maintenance.

Filmography

Film

Television

References

External links

American television directors
Television producers from New York City
American television writers
Film directors from New York City
Living people
Oberlin College alumni
Showrunners
Writers from New York City
Screenwriters from New York (state)
1984 births
21st-century American screenwriters